Ji Il-joo (born November 7, 1985) is a South Korean actor. He is known for his role in the drama series Weightlifting Fairy Kim Bok-joo (2016–2017) and  Hello, My Twenties! (2016)

Directing
In 2018, Ji is making his debut as a director through the upcoming indie film Arrogance. Ji is also the scriptwriter and lead actor in his film.

Filmography

Film

Television series

References 

1985 births
South Korean male television actors
Living people
People from Seoul
Male actors from Seoul
Chungju Ji clan